Periodic elections for the Tasmanian Legislative Council were held on 1 August 2020. They were initially planned for 30 May; however, due to the COVID-19 pandemic, the electoral commission delayed the date of the election until August, in anticipation for the next Legislative Council sitting date on 25 August.

The two seats up for election were Huon and Rosevears. They were previously contested in 2014.

Huon 

The seat of Huon was held by independent Robert Armstrong. He first won the seat in the 2014 election. Armstrong recontested the seat, and one of his challengers was his great niece, Debbie. The seat was won by Labor candidate Bastian Seidel.

Rosevears 

The seat of Rosevears was held by independent candidate Kerry Finch. He was first elected in the 2002 election, but he did not recontest. The seat was won by Liberal candidate Jo Palmer.

References 

Tasmanian Legislative Council
Tasmanian